Marta Fascina (born 9 January 1990) is an Italian politician from Forza Italia. She has been a member of the Chamber of Deputies since the 2018 Italian general election.

Early life and education 
She was born in Melito di Porto Salvo, Calabria, a small coastal town at the southern tip of the Italian Peninsula. She attended the Sapienza University of Rome, graduating with a degree in literature in 2018.

Personal life 
Since March 2020, Fascina has been dating former Prime Minister of Italy, Silvio Berlusconi, who is 54 years her senior.

References 

1990 births
21st-century Italian women politicians
Deputies of Legislature XVIII of Italy
Forza Italia (2013) politicians
Living people
People from Calabria
Sapienza University of Rome alumni
Deputies of Legislature XIX of Italy
Women members of the Chamber of Deputies (Italy)